Evciler Castle, also called as Kızılbağ Castle, and Evcili Castle is a small medieval castle in Mersin Province, Turkey.

Visitors from Mersin follow to highway norths to Kızılbağ, and from there eastwards to Değirmendere. The castle is situated on a -high hill. It overlooks Kızılbağ Pond.

There is no historical document about the castle, which was formally surveyed in 1979. But, judging from the masonry, it may be a Byzantine or Armenian fortification. It has small rectangular plan and three storey keep.

References

Castles in Mersin Province
Toroslar District
Hill castles